Steatoda variata is a species of cobweb spider in the family Theridiidae. It is found in the United States and Mexico.

Subspecies
These two subspecies belong to the species Steatoda variata:
 (Steatoda variata variata) Gertsch, 1960
 Steatoda variata china Gertsch, 1960

References

Further reading

 

Steatoda
Articles created by Qbugbot
Spiders described in 1960